Fajer Al-Kaisi (born May 7, 1979) is an Iraqi-Canadian actor, best known for his recurring role as Osama bin Laden / OBL in the third season of Future Man, a atheist version of the real-life terrorist from an alternate reality where he was prevented from becoming one.

Early life 
Born in Iraq, Al-Kaisi spent much time of his childhood being raised in Kuwait and later settled in Montreal, Quebec, Canada. He soon moved to the United States, where he had completed his Masters in Acting from the University of Texas at Austin.

Career

Personal life
Al-Kaisi is fluent in English, French, and Arabic and speaks conversational Spanish and Italian.

He currently resides in New York City.

Filmography

References

External links 

Living people
1979 births
Iraqi emigrants to Canada
Iraqi male film actors
Iraqi male television actors
Iraqi voice actors
Moody College of Communication alumni
Canadian male film actors
Canadian male television actors
Canadian male voice actors
21st-century Iraqi male actors
21st-century Canadian male actors